VfB Germania Halberstadt is a German football club from Halberstadt in Saxony-Anhalt.

History 
The club was founded on 26 October 1949 as Betriebssportgemeinschaft Reichsbahn Halberstadt before being renamed BSG Lokomotive Halberstadt in 1950. Through the 1970s the team played in the East German third division DDR-Bezirksliga.

After German reunification in 1990 the team was re-established as Eisenbahnsportverein Halberstadt and spent two seasons in the Verbandsliga Sachsen-Anhalt (IV) before slipping to the Landesliga Sachsen-Anhalt in 1992. Formed as a sports club for railway workers, the number of rail workers actually represented in the membership of the club dropped below 20% and it lost its affiliation with the Railway Sports Federation in 1993. The club became VfB Halberstadt that year while the footballers went their own way in 1994 as Fußball Club Germania Halberstadt, adopting the heritage of a local pre-war side. VfB Germania Halberstadt was formed when the two clubs were reunited in 1997.

A third-place result in the Landesliga Sachsen-Anhalt Mitte (VI) and successful promotion playoff returned Halberstadt to Verbandsliga (V) competition in 2000, and after winning the division title in 2003, they advanced to the Oberliga Nordost-Süd (IV). They went on to win the Oberliga (V) in 2011 and advance to the Regionalliga Nord (IV). That league saw Germania and other northeastern clubs move to the Regionalliga Nordost on its refoundation in 2012 where it played for the next four seasons until relegation in 2016. It was immediately promoted back to the Regionalliga Nordost in 2017 after finishing runners-up in the Oberliga Süd and beating Optik Rathenow in a play-off.

Current squad

Honours
The club's honours:
 NOFV-Oberliga Süd (V)
 Champions: 2010–11
 Runners-up: 2016–17 
 Verbandsliga Sachsen-Anhalt (V)
 Champions: 2002–03
 Saxony-Anhalt Cup
 Runners-up: 2009–10, 2012–13, 2016–17, 2019

References

External links 
 Official website 
 Abseits Guide to German Soccer

 
Football clubs in Germany
Football clubs in Saxony-Anhalt
Association football clubs established in 1949
Football clubs in East Germany
1949 establishments in East Germany
Railway association football clubs in Germany